Rhododendron galactinum (乳黄叶杜鹃) is a species of flowering plant in the family Ericaceae. The flowers are white to pale pink with a crimson basal blotch.

References

Sources
 "Rhododendron galactinum", I. B. Balfour ex Tagg, Notes Roy. Bot. Gard. Edinburgh. 15: 103. 1926.

galactinum
Taxa named by Isaac Bayley Balfour